Keon Coleman (born May 17, 2003) is an American football wide receiver for the Michigan State Spartans. He also plays for the Michigan State Spartans basketball team.

High school career
Coleman attended Opelousas Catholic School in Opelousas, Louisiana. He played both football and basketball in high school. He committed to Michigan State University to play college football and college basketball.

College career
As a true freshman at Michigan State in 2021, Coleman played in 10 games and had seven receptions for 50 yards and a touchdown. After the season, he played in six games for the school's basketball team. As a sophomore in 2022, he became a starter.

References

External links
Michigan State Spartans bio

2003 births
Living people
Players of American football from Louisiana
American football wide receivers
Michigan State Spartans football players
Michigan State Spartans men's basketball players